TMF (abbreviation of The Music Factory) was a 24-hour music channel operated by Viacom International Media Networks in the Netherlands. The channel was previously in every standard TV package, but it ceased operating on 1 September 2011. The channels operations were based in Amsterdam. The channel was previously known as TMF6 and TMF9.

History 
TMF was launched on 1 May 1995 by Lex Harding (then director of Radio 538), producer Herman Braakman, director Ewart van der Horst and multimedia company Arcade. It was the first Dutch music station competing against MTV Europe within the region. The Netherlands did not at that time have its own music station, in most municipalities, only English-language MTV Europe could be received. At first, TMF had a limited reach within the Netherlands, but this quickly increased. The nascent channel featured Sylvana Simons, Bridget Maasland, Isabelle Brinkman, Fabienne de Vries, Ruud de Wild, Michael Pilarczyk, Wessel van Diepen and Erik de Zwart as its VJs. During the years the VJ line-up changed to include Tooske Breugem, Daphne Bunskoek and Mental Theo. The last VJs on the channel included Miljuschka Witzenhausen and Nikkie Plessen.

The first clip that aired on TMF was "Too Much Love Will Kill You" by Brian May.

In the first months of 1995, the station went as TMF6. TMF then had to share a channel on many cable networks with TV10 Gold. TMF sent initially only eight hours a day new programs, from 16:00 to 24:00. During the other hours of the programs were repeated. TMF6 began on May 1, 1995, to broadcast and shared in the early months of a station with the channel TV10 Gold. Both stations were part of media company Wegener Arcade. TMF6 sent out in the afternoon to 6pm; After this time the programming was done by TV10 Gold. Because TV10 Gold gained woefully low ratings, Wegener Arcade developed in the autumn of 1995 a plan for the channel to form in TV10. In that way it had to "repeat channel TV10 its "dowdy" image to get rid. Simultaneously TMF6 should be broadcast on a private news channel.

In 1995 both went SBS 6 and Veronica started. Both channels claimed channel 6. blazed a fierce battle between the two stations, which eventually (unofficially) was won by SBS 6. Veronica therefore took 6 out of its logo and TMF turned in the autumn of 1995, the number 6, so that the channel TMF9 has been called. After the acquisition by MTV in 2002, the figure 9 from the logo disappeared The station was officially now just TMF. On August 2, 2005 9 came back into the TMF logo but kept the channel still officially called TMF. 9 is probably a counterattack on the Discovery Channel, which was launched action a day earlier in Netherlands to put/get the channel on 9. Also TV Gelderland called to program its viewers the station on preset choice test 9. Later the station was drastically changed with a new style logos, commercials and programs. Here the 9 disappeared.

In the beginning TMF's viewing figures were still very low, but within a few years the figures were higher than those of competitor MTV. Eventually TMF's success in Netherlands mean that also in Belgium, the United Kingdom and Australia a TMF channel was started. From these channels, the Belgian was the only TMF channel which still broadcast, this has also been shut down on November 1, 2015, and was replaced by Comedy Central.

Because of the great success that had TMF took over in 2002 MTV Networks shares on TMF. TMF was from that moment an interactive music station (SMS-based games in video clips) with minimal presentation; almost all VJs and TMF programs were transferred to the (new) Dutch MTV. A policy change was instituted in 2003 and 2004, making a number of programs that were transferred to MTV in 2002, came back again on TMF, including Mental Theo on the Road, presented by Mental Theo, and the Top 40, presented by Jeroen Nieuwenhuize. Both programs, though, are from the tube removed because TMF wanted to get a younger and hipper character.

Despite the launch of a local MTV Netherlands channel within the region in 2000. TMF continued to surpass MTV in audience ratings. To counteract this competition in 2002, MTV Networks Europe purchased TMF's operations in the Netherlands and Belgium. TMF shifted it attention towards more interactive programming, whilst some music programming from TMF was moved to MTV Nederland such as Mental Theo on the Road and Top 40 before moving back to TMF.

With the expansion of digital television TMF launched further brands which included TMF Dance (Techno, Trance and House music), TMF NL (Dutch music) and TMF Pure (R'n'B, Hip-Hop and urban). TMF Live also launched focusing on live music.

In April 2007 there were made more changes at TMF. So there were new programs and was put online a new website in March 2007. As of June 2007 the number was doubled and VJs on July 16, 2007, there is a (re)new(ed) site went into the air. Also, all SMS games disappeared. But the sender sent still simply clips under the same name. With all these changes TMF ultimately develop a new corporate identity to know. Came especially for this occasion on March 7, 2008 Fabienne de Vries, Sylvana Simons, Jeroen Post and Renate Verbaan once back at TMF.

After 2008, TMF's success rapidly decreased. It went further and further downhill with TMF, which from January 1 to April 3, 2011, to see the station was only from 6:00 to 15:00. At other times it was to see Comedy Central (formerly Comedy Central sent out on the channel of Nickelodeon). As a result, some VJs moved to MTV. On April 4 Kindernet took the place of TMF.

From 15:00 pm on April 3, 2011, to September 1 later that year TMF was only seen on the Internet, but again 24 hours a day. On September 1, the channel was (including all digital channels and the internet channel) definitely ceased.

From 1996 to 2011 TMF also organized TMF Awards. The event thus prevailed around 2002, the year in which most VJs had moved to MTV. However, in 2011 with the shutdown of TMF Nederland the TMF Awards are replaced by the Dutch MTV Awards. Even in Belgium, since 2011 there are no more TMF Awards. The disappearance of the channel was easily dismissed by the public, meanwhile, there are many other music channels, especially in the digital package.

Closure of TMF
On 4 November 2010 Viacom International Media Networks announced from 1 January 2011 TMF would only broadcast between 06:00 until 15:00 daily. On 4 April TMF was replaced by Kindernet and TMF as brand officially ceased on 1 September 2011 when TMF.nl stopped broadcasting the channel online. VJ's from TMF were transferred to MTV Nederland. TMF's digital channels ceased broadcasting on 31 December 2011.

Come back 
On 30 April 2020 Erik de Zwart announces that he is working on the return of TMF. He wants to make an online platform of the former music channel.

VJs through the years
Presenters or VJs of the first hour were Sylvana Simons, Bridget Maasland, Isabelle Brinkman, Fabienne de Vries, Ruud de Wild, Michael Pilarczyk, Wessel van Diepen and Erik de Zwart. The four ladies had mentioned a modest hit in the spring of 1997 when the group The Magnificent Four. Later they were replaced under more and completed by Tooske Breugem, Daphne Bunskoek, Mental Theo, Jeroen Post, Sonja Silva and Renée Vervoorn. In 2002 moved many VJs with their programs to MTV. Only the VJs Jeroen Post and Renée Vervoorn remained at TMF. The number of VJs had to remain minimal. Not much later Renée Vervoorn departed too. Later the team was reinforced by Mental Theo. Sylvie Meis came from MTV to TMF and Jeroen Nieuwenhuize came also back to TMF. With a big election "Vote the VJ" has been at the TMF Awards 2004 Renate Verbaan elected new VJ. Sylvie Meis left the VJ team and not much later Miljuschka Witzenhausen strengthen the team. During the TMF Awards 2005 left Jeroen Post and Mental Theo's VJ team. Valerio Zeno joined the VJ team. During the TMF Awards 2006 went Renate Verbaan even at TMF and was replaced by Nikkie Plessen. From June 2007 the VJ team will really be enhanced by Saar, Soumia and Damien. Therefore, there is no longer any question of a minimal presentation. On October 30, 2007, Miljuschka presented her last episode on TMF. She has been replaced since 1 January 2008 by Sascha Visser. On March 18, 2010 Saar Koningsberger made in the TMF program Kijk Dit Nou, known must leave TMF in connection with the Flexwet. On 24 April 2010, she presented her last Kijk Dit Nou. As of 1 December 2010, Sascha Visser also leaves TMF.

VJs 1995-2011 
 Bridget Maasland (1995–2000)
 Erik de Zwart (1995–2002)
 Until 2003 VJ at MTV
 Fabienne de Vries (1995–2000)
 Isabelle Brinkman (1995–1998)
 Michael Pilarczyk (1995–1996)
 Ruud de Wild (1995–1998)
 Sylvana Simons (1995–1999)
 Wessel van Diepen (1995–1998)
 Jeroen Post (1996–2005)
 Tooske Ragas (1998–2002)
 Until 2002 VJ at MTV
 Daphne Bunskoek (1998–2002)
 Until 2002 VJ at MTV
 Jeroen Nieuwenhuize (1998–2002, 2003–2007)
 Between 2002 and 2003 VJ at MTV
 Murth Mossel (1999-2000)
 Mental Theo (1999–2002, 2003–2005)
 Between 2002 and 2003 VJ at MTV
 Sonja Silva (1999–2001)
 Renee Vervoorn (2000–2003)
 Johnny de Mol (2001–2002)
 Until 2003 VJ at MTV
 Seth Kamphuijs (2001–2002)
 Until 2005 VJ at MTV
 Kristina Bozilovic (2001–2002)
 Until 2003 VJ at MTV
 Virtuele Sita (2002-2003)
 Sylvie Meis (2003–2004)
 In 2002-2003 VJ at MTV
 Renate Verbaan (2004–2006)
 Miljuschka Witzenhausen (2005–2007)
 Valerio Zeno (2005–2008)
 Nikkie Plessen (2006–2008)
 Damien Hope (2007–2008)
 Soumia Abalhaja (2007–2008)
 Saar Koningsberger (2007–2010)
 Sascha Visser (2008–2010)
 Amir Charles (2008–2011) (now on MTV)
 Veronica van Hoogdalem (2008–2011)
 Willem "Willy" de Bruin (2009–2011) (now on MTV)
 Tess Milne (2010–2011) (now on MTV)

(Old) TMF Programs
 The Dj's
The TMF program where the late 90s all the time known DJs from the scene made their appearance.

 Toute Fabienne
Popular afternoon magazine with Fabienne de Vries as a presenter. Besides emitting many video clips were faxes from viewers read. The program was broadcast daily between 17.00 and 19.00.

 Totally Tooske
Successor of Toute Fabienne, with presenter Tooske Ragas.

 D-Day
Successor of Totally Tooske, with Daphne Bunskoek as a presenter.

 Cyberchoice
Broadcast in the late evening, nightly and morning hours this was a program where viewers through a kind of voice telephone system could determine the next music video. The music videos previously received codes in order to facilitate the tuning. Therefore, found several people in the regional voting system of music channel "The Box corpses", a music which since 1995 made use of this principle.

This program was around 1999 on Monday, Friday, Saturday and Sunday broadcast from 01:00 at night until 6 am. On Tuesday and Wednesday the program began at midnight. On Thursday Cyber Choice began at half past one at night.

 Weekend Special
In this program, attention was given to one artist or group that often all week was special in interest on the transmitter. The broadcasts were from 20.00 to 22.00 on Sundays, but (for example) long concert recordings program ran out.

 NL Made in Holland
This program was all kinds of work of Dutch central.

 Clip Classics
Top 10 program with old hits presented by Bridget Maasland. Later this program continued without presenter and it was an hour old hits.

 Wet & Wild
Een hard rock and heavy metal program that was presented from 1995 to 1998 by Ruud de Wild. The Wild stopped after criticism from viewers on the limited variation and selection in the program. In his last broadcast, he thanked the viewers for all fine, dear letters which supported him in his decision. After leaving the program went some time without presenter. Frank Helmink (Buma Cultuur came shortly after the start of the program as editor of Wet & Wild, because he delivered founded criticism of the program, which he described how the program saw for themselves.

 SonjaSilva.com
Successor of D-Day, with Sonja Silva as presenter.

 Dag Top 5
Daily Frequent compiled by viewers of TMF. The program started with a new video called TMF. The program started with a new video called Hot or Not. During the program was called and faxed to vote for or against the clip, which was subject to a majority of voters at the end of the program repeated. The rest of the program was filled with interviews with viewers who could then announce their favorite clip. The program was daily by another VJ presented between 19.00 and 20.00. Day Top 5 later went back on MTV, but then integrated in season 2 of Reaction. Presented by VJ Miljuschka. During TMF her last time in the base tvpakket came the Day Top 5 once again. Between 14:30 and 15:00 on Monday to Thursday and from 14:00 to 15:00 on Fridays, in this new version, people could vote via Twitter with #dt5. TMF Belgium sends this program still out.

 Clipparade Top 30
Top 30 most requested videos. Originally presented by Fabienne de Vries. Later acquired by Tooske Breugem.

 Hakkeehhh!!
A weekly program in which Hardcore techno and gabber were central. Clips were shown and there were images of celebrations. This was presented by different presenters. The reason swings were herein was because most of the images were supplied directly by the organizers of these raves as ID&T, Tomorrow Entertainment, XSV, ISP, Shadowlands, etc.

 Hitzone
A weekly program in which new music videos and clips were broadcast from foreign charts. Following this program, the compilation CD series Hitzone set.

 Nederlandse Top 40
Presented by Erik de Zwart, later by Jeroen Nieuwenhuize.

 The Pitch
A program specifically aimed at hip-hop. Glaze presented this program together with René (known from 2 Brothers on the 4th Floor) between 1996 and 1998. Well-known national and international rappers came along in the program (including Warren G, Notorious B.I.G. and Postmen). Murth The Man-O-Script also has this program yet presented between 1999 and 2000.

 Play
Originally live after-school program presented by Jeroen Post and Renée Vervoorn. When Renée Vervoorn left the show flopped. Later it was thanks Renate Verbaan little better, but still not as it should be. When Jeroen Post departed the show was knocked over, it was not live, and there were 2 female VJs. People, however, missed the live feel, and the show disappeared from the tube.

 Babetrap
In this interactive program Sylvie Meis went crisscross throughout Netherlands and she visits various sites where young people can be found.

 TMF F.R.S.H.
In 2005, the first talent show TMF, F.R.S.H. in collaboration with Mentos. In 6 rounds 12 people were selected, of which only 2 were in the final. Therefore, an Internet ballot was set and a semi-final where the last 5 went. In the final Netherlands took on Belgium, and won Judith from the Netherlands with her stand-up act. It was presented by Miljuschka.

 Wakker worden met Valerio
Program where VJ Valerio Zeno every day, two months went looking for another place to sleep, and the viewer could offer its own place to sleep, and had to be remembered in return. (Season 1: April 2006 until June 2006, season 2: September 2006)

 Re:Action
Live after-school program presented by VJs Saar Koningsberger, Damien Hope, Nikkie Plessen and Sascha Visser. Subjects from daily life are discussed, such as drugs, smoking, alcohol, etc. It is therefore a theorem invented where viewers can vote on. You can also come with your webcam image. For that, you need to download the TMF Music Messenger.

 TMF Gamezone presents: Cybernet
Program in which all the field of games was handled. The show was launched on May 20, 1998, and talked to each other by a voice-over from Jeroen Nieuwenhuize or Tooske Breugem. After the merger of TMF and MTV it was shortened in May 2002 to a cube Gamefacts.

 Gamekings
The current game program from TMF. Here the newest games are discussed and visited events. Is presented by Skate the Great and other game journalists.

 TMF Op Weg
Program where VJ Miljuschka touring throughout the Netherlands on their way to concerts by various festivals, such as Pink and Paaspop.

 TMF Jump
Program where each week new jumpstyle 'moves' are shown, interactive, because the viewer can submit his or her own jump movie.

 TMF Clubcam
A live show from various discos, where the viewer via SMS and 0900 number determines is emitted from the disco and the music is played.

 Scoots en Helmets
Program which is broadcast every Thursday with all information on the latest trends of the scooter. The program is presented by the duo Valerio Zeno and Nikkie Plessen.

 De Dagrand
A live late at night every day with a different theme and a different VJ. Looks a lot like the new Re:Action, but the issues go much further and there are other VJs. Meanwhile, removed from the tube.

 Wakker Worden op Vakantie
A sequel to "Wakker Worden met Valerio", but not in people's homes. 2 VJs both go separately to another seaside resort with people who sleep on holiday there. Furthermore, the concept is exactly the same and they should also do something in return. That consideration devised by TMF and the people who sleep join the VJ. Waking on Vacation in 2007 presented by VJ Saar (from Chersonissos) and VJ Damien (from Lloret de Mar). In 2008 it is presented again. VJ Saar (Chersonissos) against rapper Willy needs of The Opposites in Lloret de Mar staying.

 TMF Superchart
A weekly chart show that is broadcast from March, and in which not only the selling singles and airplay but also (free) downloaded songs are included.

 Valerio duikt onder
From March 7 Valerio goes into hiding in various subcultures, including Moroccans, showmen, goths, line dancers and transvestites. Valerio adjusts his dress, appearance and demeanor to complete, the group with whom he clears that day.

 TMF Pure
Show hosted by VJ Damien Hope. He brings the latest Contemporary R&B videos at Mondays at 12:00 & 22:00

 TMF Rock top 10
Program where the latest rock videos come by. Every Tuesday at 12:00 & 22:00

 TMF NL
Show where the latest videos of Dutch artists passing with Presentation of VJ Soumia. Every Thursday at 12:00 & 22:00

 TMF Dance
Program where VJ Saar shows you the best dance hits. Every Friday at 12:00 & 22:00

 TMF In De Mix
Weekly videomixshow of DJ/VJ Stephanie Cassandra where the latest video clips and footage shot during the same catering tour alternate. The tour of the program, followed in 2009 by TMF On Tour. Every Friday at 19:00 and every Saturday at 20:00 and 24:00

 Your chart
Successor of Dag Top 5. Program where the viewer decides which videos are broadcast. The votes cast in the Your chart will count in the superchart on Saturday. This program is similar to the interactive chart. Every day at 15.30 and 20.00

 Op de bank met Sascha
Program where with VJ Sascha can be won a date.

 Kamerdansen.nl
Program where you with VJ Nikkie a night out with your best friends can win. You have to show your best dance moves for the webcam.

 Wakker Worden met Sascha
Program which you can wake up with VJ Sascha in the strangest places.

 Paperboygang
Program where newspaper deliverers Cosmo, Pux and Laurens given an assignment to fulfill their free time in 23 hours.

 Kijk Dit Nou!
Daily live after-school program presented by various VJs. Hot topics and news are discussed, including a statement devised where viewers can vote via the Kijk Dit Nou website. On December 17, 2010, the last episode of Kijk Dit Nou! was broadcast.

 Wat te doen voor je Poen
This program was VJ Saar van Koningsbergen every week to try another job, when Saar stopped TMF, Sascha took this over.

 Het leukste dorp van Nederland
This program presented Saar van Koningsberen along with Willem (Willy) de Bruin. In this program, 10 villages competed for the title "Het leukste dorp van Nederland".

See also
The Music Factory

References

External links
TMF Nederland (Dutch) directs viewers to MTV.NL
Official Facebook page
Official Twitter page
Official Hyves page (closed)

Music television channels
Defunct television channels in the Netherlands
1995 establishments in the Netherlands
Television channels and stations established in 1995
Television channels and stations disestablished in 2011
Music organisations based in the Netherlands
2011 disestablishments in the Netherlands